Krasnoarmeysky (masculine), Krasnoarmeyskaya (feminine), or Krasnoarmeyskoye (neuter) may refer to:
Krasnoarmeysky District, name of several districts in the countries of the former Soviet Union
Krasnoarmeysky (inhabited locality) (Krasnoarmeyskaya, Krasnoarmeyskoye), name of several inhabited localities in Russia